German Silicon Valley may refer to various technology clusters and associations in Germany.

WISTA Science and Technology Park, Berlin-Adlershof
IT cluster Rhine-Main-Neckar, in the Rhine-Main and Rhine-Neckar regions

 Silicon Allee, Berlin
 Isar Valley, Munich, Bavaria
 Silicon Saxony, Dresden, Saxony, Elbe river valley around the city 

 Solar Valley, Thalheim, Saxony-Anhalt
 German International School of Silicon Valley, California

See also 
List of places with "Silicon" names
List of technology centers